Eugenia Mathilda Enequist, (1833–1898) was a Swedish opera singer and singing instructor, also known as Signora Biondini.

Born in Visby, Gotland, Sweden, the daughter of a vicar, Johan Enequist, she was educated in Stockholm, Leipzig, and then in Paris, where she was instructed by Masset and Levasseur before she was employed in the Comédie-Italienne under the stage name Biondini (The Blonde), but soon moved to London, where she was a concert singer and singing instructor. Until 1879, she toured in Europe, also in her native Stockholm. She died, aged about 65, in London.

References 

 Österberg, Carin et al., Svenska kvinnor: föregångare, nyskapare. Lund: Signum 1990.

1833 births
1898 deaths
Swedish operatic sopranos
Voice teachers
Women of the Victorian era
19th-century Swedish women opera singers
People from Gotland